Dr Julius Leonard Simkin FRSE (d.1991) was a 20th century British biochemist. In authorship he was known as J. L. Simkin.

Life
He was born in England in the 1920s. He studied Science at Liverpool University graduating BSc around 1950.

In 1954 he received a doctorate (PhD) in Physiology from the University of Birmingham.

He was senior lecturer in Biochemistry at Aberdeen University.

In 1979 he was elected a Fellow of the Royal Society of Edinburgh. His proposers were Hamish Keir, G. A. Garton, P. E. Weatherley, C. F. Mills, Peter Hobson, J. D. Matthews, F. C. Frazer and P.T. Grant.

He died on 19 January 1991.

Publications

Vitamin B12 and Protein Biosynthesis (1959)
The Incorporation of Radioactive Amino Acids into Protein (1960)
A Broad View of Proteins (1964)

References

1991 deaths
Alumni of the University of Liverpool
Academics of the University of Aberdeen
British biochemists
Fellows of the Royal Society of Edinburgh